Estep v. United States, 327 U.S. 114 (1946), was a case in which the Supreme Court of the United States held that a draft board's refusal to classify a Jehovah's Witness as minister is, after exhausting administrative remedies, subject to judicial review.

Background 
According to the judicial opinion itself:
Estep's local board classified him as I-A, i.e., as available for military service. Sec. 5(d) of the Selective Service Act exempts from training and service (but not from registration) "regular or duly ordained ministers of religion". Under the regulations those in that category are classified as IV-D. Estep, a member of Jehovah's Witnesses, claimed that he was entitled to that classification. The local board ruled against him. He took his case to the appeal board which classified him as I-A. He then asked the State and National Directors of Selective Service to appeal to the President for him. His request was refused. The local board thereupon ordered him to report for induction. He reported at the time and place indicated. He was accepted by the Navy. But he refused to be inducted, claiming that he was exempt from service because he was an ordained minister of the gospel. He was indicted under  11 of the Act for wilfully failing and refusing to submit to induction. He sought to defend on the ground that as a Jehovah's Witness he was a minister of religion and that he had been improperly denied exemption from service, because the classifying agencies acted arbitrarily and capriciously in refusing to classify him as IV-D.

References

External links
 
 

1946 in United States case law
United States Supreme Court cases
United States Supreme Court cases of the Stone Court
Jehovah's Witnesses litigation in the United States
Conscription in the United States
Conscription law
1946 in religion
Christianity and law in the 20th century